Yunnanilus niulanensis is a species of freshwater ray-finned fish, a stone loach from the genus Yunnanilus. Its type locality is the  Yanglinhe River in Songming County in Yunnan. The specific name refers to the Niulanjiang River, in the Yangtze basin, of which the Yanglinhe is a tributary.

References

N
Taxa named by Chen Zi-Ming
Taxa named by Yang Jian
Taxa named by Yang Jun-Xing
Fish described in 2012
Endemic fauna of China